Wanderlust is an independently owned UK travel magazine which focuses on cultural, and special interest travel. The print and digital magazine is published six times a year with the strap-line "taking the road less travelled".

Awards 

Travmedia Travel Magazine of the Year 2020

Travel Media Awards Consumer Publication of the Year Print 2020

Special Interest Magazine/Brand of the Year at the Professional Publishers Association (PPA) Awards

History 
Wanderlust was established in Windsor, Berkshire in 1993 by Paul Morrison and Lyn Hughes, who had observed the absence of a publication combining their interests in wildlife, activities and cultural insights. Morrison died in December 2004 and Hughes took on the roles of publisher, managing director and editor-in-chief. Over the years, the magazine was sold and acquired by several media companies before being privately purchased in January 2020 by Georgios Kipouros - a former AI entrepreneur - who took over as both CEO and editor-in-chief. Hughes - an award winning travel writer - remains an important part of the business as a founding editor and frequently hosts, introduces, and speaks at travel events, as well as on Wanderlust's podcast. 

The magazine includes features on off-the-beaten-track travel; sustainable, alternative destinations; and authentic, experiential trips. The Wanderlust website includes archives from backdated editions alongside informational travel articles.

Wanderlust magazine is also known for its travel photography, with its editorial photos taken by a host of travel photographers from around the globe. For over 20 years, Wanderlust has hosted its annual Wanderlust Travel Photo of the Year competition and event, held in London. The majority of the categories are for amateur photographers, with one being open to professionals. 

The Wanderlust Reader Travel Awards is celebrated annually and invites the magazine - and more recently digital - audiences to vote for their favourite destinations. The 2021 Wanderlust Reader Travel Awards was held at Kensington Palace, with the 21st awards due to be held in the Tower of London in November 2022. The annual Wanderlust World Guide Awards was launched in 2005 in memory of Morrison. This global award celebrates exceptional tour guides and tour leaders and is supported by The Daily Telegraph. The winners are voted for by readers of the magazine and previous judges include Bill Bryson, Michael Palin, and Kate Humble.

References

External links 
 
 Paul Morrison Obituary
 Haymarket Magazines buy into Wanderlust

Magazines published in the United Kingdom
Tourism magazines
Magazines established in 1993
1993 establishments in the United Kingdom
Photography magazines
Mass media in Berkshire